Ambrosia ilicifolia is a species of ragweed known by the common names hollyleaf burr ragweed and hollyleaf bursage.

It is native to the deserts and mountains of western Arizona, and the adjacent Sonoran Desert areas of southeastern California, Sonora and Baja California. It grows in dry washes, scrub, and other local habitats.

Description
Ambrosia ilicifolia is a small, matted shrub under  in height. Its stiff, straight branches are green, glandular, and leafy when young, and light gray and leafless when older. The holly-like leaves are leathery but brittle, oval-shaped to rounded, and edged with spine-tipped teeth. They are green, veiny and sticky with resin.

The inflorescence holds several spiny staminate (male) flower heads next to larger pistillate (female) heads. Each pistillate head produces usually two fruits, which are yellow-brown burrs nearly 2 centimeters wide. Each burr is rounded, sticky, and covered in hooked spines.

References

External links
 Calflora Database: Ambrosia ilicifolia (Holly leaved burbush,  Hollyleaf bursage)
 Jepson Manual eFlora (TKM2) treatment of Ambrosia ilicifolia
 UC Calphotos Photo gallery: Ambrosia ilicifolia

ilicifolia
Flora of the Sonoran Deserts
Flora of the California desert regions
Flora of Arizona
Flora of Baja California
Flora of Sonora
Natural history of the Colorado Desert
Plants described in 1876
Taxa named by Asa Gray
Flora without expected TNC conservation status